The Brunei national football team (recognized as Brunei Darussalam by FIFA), nicknamed Tebuan (The Wasps), is the national team of Brunei, controlled by the Football Association of Brunei Darussalam. The team was founded in 1959 and joined FIFA in 1969. In the past, they have also frequently featured in the Malaysian league and cup competitions as one of the state representative sides.

The Brunei State Football Amateur Association was formed on 15 March 1956. In 1993, the word "Amateur" was dropped, and they were known as the Brunei Football Association. Brunei's experience of international football has been more or less restricted to regional Asian competitions, such as the Southeast Asian Games and the Tiger Cup. So far, Brunei has entered the World Cup qualifiers only four times, in 1986, 2002, 2018 and 2022. On these occasions, they did not qualify for the competition. They have made five appearances in the Asian Cup qualifiers, but they have never passed the first qualification round.

History

Early days 
The national team's first appearance took place during the 1972 AFC Asian Cup qualification, where they were unable to qualify after all three heavy defeats. The following two championships (1976 and 1977) were no different from the first, with their first and second victory during the 1980 Summer Olympics. In 1979, Brunei entered a team to compete in the professional Malaysian league and despite competing against Malaysian clubs, Brunei had previously never made an impact. However, in 1999, they shocked everyone by lifting the Malaysia Cup.

Brunei won their first and only Brunei Merdeka Games trophy in 1985. Since then, team was not able to qualify into or win any major tournaments. Coming the closest was the 1993 Philippines International Cup, where they came in third position after a 1–0 victory against the Philippines.

Suspension
In September 2009, the Brunei Football Association (BAFA) was suspended due to governmental interference in its affairs, which started with a decision by the Brunei authorities to dissolve BAFA and to replace it with a new federation in December 2008. The suspension was applied with immediate effect and meant that the Brunei club DPMM were no longer permitted to play in the Singapore S-League until it was resolved. DPMM FC has confirmed to Football Association of Singapore (FAS) that they are unable to finish their S.League season because of the issue with its association. FIFA rejected FAS's final request on 17 October 2009 to permit DPMM to compete in the current S.League season while BAFA's suspension persisted.

On 19 March 2010, the FIFA Executive Committee agreed to submit to the next FIFA Congress the expulsion of the association if the BAFA has not been reinstated by then, after noting that no major progress had been made since the BAFA was suspended in September 2009. FIFA warned that unless BAFA came to FIFA's Congress on 9 and 10 June in South Africa having met the conditions for reinstatement it would be expelled. Brunei were re-instated on 31 May 2011 and the National Football Association of Brunei Darussalam (NFABD) was formed that same year.

Reform 

Upon returning to the football action, the Wasps were unable to qualify for both the 2012 and 2014 AFF Championship following several losses. Brunei was again defeated 2–1 in aggregate against Chinese Taipei during the 2018 FIFA World Cup Qualification in March 2015. The wasps failed to qualify for the 2016 AFF Championship after suffering defeats from Cambodia and Laos. During the 2016 AFC Solidarity Cup, Brunei finished fourth place after losing 3–2 to Laos. Despite the disappointment, Shah Razen Said from the Bruneian side managed to become the tournament's top striker, finishing with a total of 4 goals.

Timor Leste defeated Brunei in the second leg qualifying match at the Hassanal Bolkiah National Stadium on 8 September 2018, securing their spot in the AFF Suzuki Cup final round group action for the first time in 14 years. Despite having a two-goal advantage from the first leg, Timor Leste fell 1–0 but still advanced with a 3–2 aggregate score. Brunei defeated Mongolia 2–1 on 11 June 2019, but were unable to advance to the next stage of the preliminary joint qualification for the FIFA World Cup 2022 and the AFC Asian Cup 2023.

Under new coach Mario Rivera, Brunei managed to qualify to the 2022 AFF Championship for the first time in 26 years since its inaugural edition in 1996, by defeating Timor Leste 6–3 on aggregate. The Wasps were grouped with Thailand, Indonesia, the Philippines and Cambodia. They finished the group stage without gaining a single point, conceding at least 5 goals in every game.

Results and fixtures

2022

Coaching staff

Coaching history

  John Then (1959–71)
  Abdul Karim Pukul &  Ibrahim Yahya (1971)
  Duncan McDowell (1976–81)
  Ibrahim Damit (1982)
  Idris Damit (1983)
  Danny Bergara (1984)
  Oscar Amaro de Silva (1985–86)
  Dayem Ali (1987)
  Zainuddin Kassim (1988)
  Dayem Ali (1989)
  Hussein Aljunied (1990–93)
  Mick Lyons (1993–96)
  David Booth (1996–98)
  Mick Jones (1998–01)
  Zainuddin Kassim (2001)
  Mick Lyons (2002)
  Karim Bencherifa (2003–04)
  Amir Alagić (2005)
  Ranko Buketa (2005)
  Ali Mustafa (2006)
  Kwon Oh-Son (2008)
  Vjeran Simunić (2008–09)
  Ali Mustafa (2009–11)
  Dayem Ali (2011)
  Kwon Oh-Son (2012–13)
  Vjeran Simunić (2013–14)
  Steve Kean (2014)
  Mike Wong (2014–16)
  Kwon Oh-Son (2016)
  Stephen Ng (2017)
  Kwon Oh-Son (2018)
  Robbie Servais (2019)
  Paul Smalley (2019–20)
  Ali Mustafa (2020)
  Aminuddin Jumat (2020)
  Ameer Lani (2020)
  K. Rajagobal (2020–22)
  Rosanan Samak (2022)
  Mario Rivera (2022–)

Current squad
The following 23 players were called up for the 2022 AFF Championship.
Information correct as of 29 December 2022, after the 2022 AFF Championship match against .

Recent call-ups
The following players have also been called up to the Brunei squad in the last twelve months.

Notes
 = On standby
 = Preliminary squad
 = Retired from international duty

Player records

Players in bold are still active with Brunei.

Most capped players

Top goalscorers

Competition records

World Cup record

Asian Cup record

Asian Games

AFC Challenge Cup record

AFC Solidarity Cup record

AFF Championship
This competition was formerly known as the Tiger Cup

Head-to-head record
As of 26 December 2022 after match against

Honours
 Borneo Cup
 Winner (4): 1968, 1981, 1987, 1988
 Sultan Hassanal Bolkiah Cup
 Runners-up (1): 1985
 Philippines International Cup
 Third Place (1): 1993

References

 
Asian national association football teams